The 2004 Missouri Republican presidential primary on February 3, 2004 determined the recipient of 57 of the state's 58 delegates to the Republican National Convention in the process to elect the 44th President of the United States. It was an open primary.

Results

See also
 2004 Missouri Democratic presidential primary
 2004 Republican Party presidential primaries

References

Missouri
2004 Missouri elections
2004